Richard David Portes CBE is a professor of Economics and an Academic Directior of the AQR Asset Management Institute at London Business School. He was President of the Centre for Economic Policy Research, which he founded. He also serves as Directeur d'Etudes at the Ecole des Hautes Etudes en Sciences Sociales in Paris.

He was a Rhodes Scholar and a Fellow of Balliol College, Oxford. He also taught at Princeton University, Harvard University (as a Guggenheim Fellow), was the founder of the Economics Department at Birkbeck College (University of London) in 1972. In 1999–2000, he was the Distinguished Global Visiting Professor at the Haas School of Business, University of California, Berkeley, and in 2003–04 he was Joel Stern Visiting Professor of International Finance at Columbia Business School.

Professor Portes is a Fellow of the Econometric Society and a Fellow of the British Academy.  He was the longest serving Secretary-General of the Royal Economic Society (1992–2008) since John Maynard Keynes. He is Co-Chairman of the Board of Economic Policy. He is a member of the Group of Economic Policy Advisers to the President of the European Commission. He is the chair of the Steering Committee of the Euro50 Group, of the Bellagio Group on the International Economy, and of the Advisory Scientific Committee to the European Systemic Risk Board.

Writings
Portes's current research interests include international finance, international macroeconomics, macroprudential regulation, European integration, and European bond markets. He has written extensively on sovereign debt, European monetary and financial issues, international capital flows, centrally planned economies and transition, macroeconomic disequilibrium, and European integration. His study (with Richard Baldwin and Joseph Francois) on the Eastern Enlargement of the European Union was widely cited in the public policy debate leading up to the 2004 Enlargement. His work on collective action clauses in sovereign bond contracts, on the international role of the euro, on international financial stability and on European bond markets has been directed towards policy as well as academic publications.

Awards
Richard Portes was created CBE in the Queen’s 2003 New Year Honours.

Portes holds three honorary doctorates, including one from Paris Dauphine University

Notes

External links

  Web page of Richard Portes at London Business School
 Web page of Richard Portes on voxeu.org
 
  CEPR website

 

Living people
20th-century American economists
American Jews
Commanders of the Order of the British Empire
Fellows of the British Academy
Fellows of the Econometric Society
Academics of London Business School
Fellows of Balliol College, Oxford
Princeton University faculty
Harvard University staff
Academics of Birkbeck, University of London
British economists
Economists from Illinois
American Rhodes Scholars
Yale University alumni
People from Chicago
Alumni of Balliol College, Oxford
European Economic Community officials
Academic staff of the School for Advanced Studies in the Social Sciences
21st-century American economists
Year of birth missing (living people)